Javier or Javi Martínez may refer to:

Sportspeople

Football
Javier Martínez (footballer, born 1971), Honduran defender
Javi Martínez (footballer, born 1987), Spanish former goalkeeper
Javi Martínez (born 2 September 1988), Spanish midfielder for Bayern Munich
Javi Martínez (footballer, born 1 July 1988) Spanish former right midfielder
Javi Martínez (footballer, born 1989), Spanish forward for Náxara	
Javi Martínez (footballer, born 1997), Spanish forward for Real Unión
Javi Martínez (footballer, born 1999), Spanish winger for Osasuna

Other sports
Javier Martínez (sprinter) (born 1953), Spanish Olympic sprinter
Javier Martínez (Spanish boxer) (born 1968), Spanish Olympic boxer
Javier Martínez (baseball) (born 1977), Puerto Rican baseball player
Javier Martínez (Mexican boxer) (born 1986), Mexican boxer

Others
Javier Martínez, drummer and singer of rock band Manal
Javier Martínez (politician), American politician